Sons of Abraham were a five piece Jewish straight edge metalcore band from Long Island, New York. They released one demo, a split EP with Indecision, and CD/LP titled Termites In His Smile.  They disbanded in 1998, as guitarists Justin Beck and Todd Weinstock decided to concentrate on their other band, Glassjaw with friend Daryl Palumbo.

Discography

Studio albums 
 Termites in His Smile (1997)

EP 
7" Split with Indecision'' (1995)

Straight edge groups
Jewish heavy metal musicians
Jewish punk rock groups
Musical groups established in 1994
Musical groups disestablished in 1998
Musical groups from Long Island